The Prince of Basra is a title of nobility that was created in 1596 by Afrasiyab I after assuming the seat of ruling over Basra and establishing the House of Afrasiyab, which would rule the Principality of Basra from 1596 to 1668.

References 

Titles of nobility